Devid is a given name, a variant spelling of David. It may refer to:

 Devid Striesow (born  1973), German actor
 Devid (footballer) (born 1996), Devid de Santana Silva, Brazilian football forward
 Devid Naryzhnyy (born 1999), Russian competitive ice dancer
 Devid Eugene Bouah (born 2001), Italian football defender

See also
 David (disambiguation)